Kauvatsa is a former municipality in the Satakunta province, Finland. It was annexed with the municipality of Kokemäki in 1969. Population of Kauvatsa was 2,133 in 1968.

Villages in Finland
Former municipalities of Finland